Sportsklubben Djerv is a sports club from Møhlenpris, Bergen in Norway. The club was founded on 18 May 1913, and today it has sections for football, floorball, badminton, basketball and gymnastics. The club had an ice hockey department until 1985.

History
The club was founded on 18 May 1913 by boys from the Møhlenpris neighbourhood in Bergen.

Football
In the interwar period, the club's football team achieved good results and challenged Brann as the leading team from Bergen. The football team participated in the inaugural season of national league football in Norway; the 1937–38 Norgesserien. This season, Djerv won their group and reached the championship semi-finals where they were lost 2–3 at home against Lyn and were eliminated. They advanced from the quarter-finals through coin toss after a 6–6 draw against Viking. Djerv played in the top tier for four seasons; 1937–38, 1938–39, 1939–40 (abandoned due to the German occupation) and 1947–48.  In 2009, Djerv's football team relegated from 3. divisjon, the fourth tier in the Norwegian football league system, and has played in either the fifth or sixth tier since then.

Recent men's football seasons
{|class="wikitable"
|-bgcolor="#efefef"
! Season
!
! Pos.
! Pl.
! W
! D
! L
! GS
! GA
! P
!Cup
!Notes
!Ref.
|-
|2013 
|4. divisjon
|align=right|3
|align=right|22||align=right|11||align=right|4||align=right|7
|align=right|58||align=right|42||align=right|35
|
|
|
|-
|2014 
|4. divisjon
|align=right|6
|align=right|22||align=right|9||align=right|3||align=right|10
|align=right|48||align=right|46||align=right|30
|First qualifying round
|
|
|-
|2015 
|4. divisjon
|align=right bgcolor="#FFCCCC"|  13
|align=right|24||align=right|3||align=right|2||align=right|19
|align=right|45||align=right|74||align=right|11
|dnq
|Relegated to 5. divisjon
|
|-
|2016 
|5. divisjon
|align=right bgcolor=#DDFFDD| 1
|align=right|22||align=right|18||align=right|1||align=right|3
|align=right|83||align=right|22||align=right|55
|dnq
|Promoted to 4. divisjon
|
|-
|2017 
|4. divisjon
|align=right bgcolor="#FFCCCC"|  11
|align=right|22||align=right|5||align=right|4||align=right|13
|align=right|34||align=right|72||align=right|19
|dnq
|Relegated to 5. divisjon
|
|-
|2018 
|5. divisjon
|align=right bgcolor=#DDFFDD| 1
|align=right|22||align=right|18||align=right|2||align=right|2
|align=right|82||align=right|20||align=right|56
|dnq
|Promoted to 4. divisjon
|
|}

Ice hockey
Djerv's  ice hockey section won several league championships in the 1980s. The ice hockey section merged with Bergen Ishockeyklubb in 1985 and formed Bergen/Djerv which later went bankrupt.

References

External links
 Official site 

Sport in Bergen
Sports teams in Norway
Football clubs in Norway
Association football clubs established in 1913
Ice hockey clubs established in 1913
Defunct ice hockey teams in Norway
1913 establishments in Norway